Caleb Ewan (born 11 July 1994) is an Australian road and track bicycle racer who rides for UCI ProTeam . A sprinter, Ewan has a style similar to that of Mark Cavendish, taking an extremely low position that offers him an aerodynamic advantage.

Youth cycling 
Caleb Ewan was born in New South Wales to a Korean mother and Australian father. At the age of eight he started bicycle racing, inspired by his father, who was also a competitive cyclist. He started competitive cycling at the age of ten. In 2010 he became the Junior National Road Race Champion. The next year he won multiple disciplines at the Junior National Track Championships and he became World Champion omnium at the Junior Track World Championships.

Cycling career
In 2013 Ewan started racing for Jayco-AIS World Tour Academy. That year he won the first stage as well as the general classification of the Mitchelton Wines Bay Cycling Classic. He also won the La Côte Picarde instalment of the UCI Nations Cup U23, the Gran Premio Palio del Recioto, and stages in the Tour Alsace, Thüringen Rundfahrt der U23 and the Tour de l'Avenir. At the end of the year he finished fourth in the Men's under-23 road race at the 2013 UCI Road World Championships.

At the beginning of August, before joining , Ewan took part in the road race at the 2014 Commonwealth Games, competing for Australia. The Australian team tried to control the race for Ewan's sprint, but were unable to do so. After attempting a solo chase of the three leaders, he fell back and was the last man to finish: he finished in 12th place out of 140 who started, over 11 minutes behind the gold medallist Geraint Thomas (Wales).

His first professional wins came in the second and third stages of the 2015 Herald Sun Tour. A month later, in the Tour de Langkawi he then took his second professional win and the lead in general classification. Though he lost the overall lead of the race, Ewan won a second stage (the third victory of his career) and the points classification. He was named in the start list for the 2015 Vuelta a España, where he won stage 5, but he withdrew from the race during stage 10.

In 2016, Ewan participated in the Tour Down Under and won the first stage in a mass sprint. He made it a duo of wins by taking the sixth stage as well. He also was the victor of Stage 2 of the Herald Sun Tour, another race held on Australian soil. He was named in the start list for the 2016 Giro d'Italia. He raced in the 2017 Giro, winning stage seven in a field sprint.

In the 2019 Tour Down Under, he headbutted Jasper Philipsen in Stage 5 and was relegated to 83rd place after crossing the finish line first. In July 2019, he participated in the Tour de France, and in Stage 11 he beat Dylan Groenewegen in a tight sprint finish in Toulouse. He won stage 16 in Nîmes, narrowly beating Elia Viviani, as well as the final stage, narrowly beating Groenewegen on the Champs-Élysées.

He was the "lanterne rouge" of the 2022 Tour de France, having finished over 5 hours down on overall winner Jonas Vingegaard.

Major results

Road

2010
 1st  Road race, National Junior Championships
2011
 3rd Time trial, National Junior Championships
2012
 National Junior Championships
1st  Time trial
2nd Road race
 1st Gent–Menen
 1st Stage 4 Regio-Tour Juniors
 1st Stage 2b Liège–La Gleize
 2nd  Road race, UCI World Junior Championships
 2nd Trofeo Comune di Vertova
 2nd Trofeo Emilio Paganessi
 3rd Overall Keizer der Juniores
2013
 1st Gran Premio Palio del Recioto
 1st La Côte Picarde
 Thüringen Rundfahrt der U23
1st  Points classification
1st Stages 4 & 7
 Tour de l'Avenir
1st Stages 1 & 2
 1st Stage 2 Tour Alsace
 3rd Gran Premio Industrie del Marmo
 4th Road race, UCI World Under-23 Championships
 8th Trofeo Piva
2014
 1st  Road race, National Under-23 Championships
 1st Stage 2 Tour de l'Avenir
 2nd  Road race, UCI World Under-23 Championships
 2nd Trofeo Città di San Vendemiano
 6th Trofeo Piva
2015
 1st  Overall Tour de Korea
1st  Points classification
1st  Young rider classification
1st Stages 2, 3, 5 & 7
 1st Vuelta a La Rioja
 Tour de Langkawi
1st  Points classification
1st Stages 3 & 6
 Herald Sun Tour
1st Stages 2 & 3
 1st Stage 5 Vuelta a España
 2nd Road race, National Championships
2016
 1st EuroEyes Cyclassics
 Tour Down Under
1st Stages 1 & 6
 1st Stage 8 Tour of Britain
 1st Stage 2 Herald Sun Tour
2017
 Tour Down Under
1st  Sprints classification
1st Stages 1, 3, 4 & 6
 Tour of Britain
1st Stages 1, 3 & 6
 1st  Points classification, Tour de Yorkshire
 1st Stage 7 Giro d'Italia
 1st Stage 4 Tour de Pologne
 1st Stage 4 Abu Dhabi Tour
 10th Milan–San Remo
2018
 1st Clásica de Almería
 1st Stage 2 Tour Down Under
 1st Stage 8 Tour of Britain
 2nd Milan–San Remo
 4th Road race, National Championships
2019
 1st Brussels Cycling Classic
 Tour de France
1st Stages 11, 16 & 21
Held  after Stage 1
 Giro d'Italia
1st Stages 8 & 11
 Tour of Turkey
1st Stages 4 & 6
 1st Stage 4 UAE Tour
 1st Stage 4 ZLM Tour
 2nd Cadel Evans Great Ocean Road Race
 2nd EuroEyes Cyclassics
2020
 1st Scheldeprijs
 Tour de France
1st Stages 3 & 11
 Tour Down Under
1st Stages 2 & 4
 UAE Tour
1st  Points classification
1st Stage 2
 1st Stage 1 Tour de Wallonie
 2nd Milano–Torino
 7th Cadel Evans Great Ocean Road Race
2021
 Giro d'Italia
1st Stages 5 & 7
Held  after Stage 7
 Tour of Belgium
1st  Points classification
1st Stages 3 & 4
 1st Stage 5 Benelux Tour
 1st Stage 7 UAE Tour
 2nd Milan–San Remo
2022
 1st Grand Prix de Fourmies
 Tour of Turkey
1st Stages 1 & 6
 1st Stage 3 Tirreno–Adriatico
 1st Stage 1 Tour des Alpes-Maritimes et du Var
 1st Stage 1 Saudi Tour
 1st Stage 1 Deutschland Tour
 2nd Kuurne–Brussels–Kuurne
 2nd Elfstedenronde
 2nd Kampioenschap van Vlaanderen
2023
 2nd Grote Prijs Jean-Pierre Monseré
 6th Cadel Evans Great Ocean Road Race

Grand Tour general classification results timeline

Classic results timeline

Critériums

2012
 2nd Overall Mitchelton Wines Bay Classic
1st Stages 2 & 4
2013
 1st  Overall Mitchelton Wines Bay Classic
1st Stage 1
2014
 3rd Overall Mitchelton Wines Bay Classic
1st Stage 4
 3rd Down Under Classic
2015
 1st  Overall Mitchelton Wines Bay Classic
1st Stages 1, 2 & 3
 2nd National Championships
2016
 1st  National Championships
 1st  Overall Mitchelton Wines Bay Classic
1st Stages 1, 2 & 4
 1st Down Under Classic
2017
 1st  National Championships
 1st Down Under Classic
 3rd Overall Mitchelton Wines Bay Classic
1st Stage 3
2018
 1st  National Championships
 3rd Down Under Classic
2019
 1st Down Under Classic
 2nd Overall Bay Classic Series
1st Stages 2 & 3
2020
 1st Down Under Classic
2023
 1st Down Under Classic

Track

2011
 1st  Omnium, UCI World Junior Championships
 National Junior Championships
1st  Omnium
1st  Points race
1st  Madison
2nd Team pursuit
3rd Scratch
2012
 2nd  Individual pursuit, Oceania Championships
 National Junior Championships
2nd Madison
2nd Points race
3rd Scratch
3rd Team pursuit
2013
 2nd Team pursuit, National Championships

References

External links

 
 
 
 
 
 
 

1994 births
Living people
Australian people of Korean descent
Australian male cyclists
Australian track cyclists
Commonwealth Games competitors for Australia
Cyclists from Sydney
Cyclists at the 2014 Commonwealth Games
Australian Tour de France stage winners
Australian Giro d'Italia stage winners
Australian Vuelta a España stage winners
20th-century Australian people
21st-century Australian people